The Loening SL was an American submarine-based reconnaissance flying boat designed and built by Loening Aeronautical Engineering for the United States Navy.

Design and development
First flown in 1931 the Loening SL was lightweight flying-boat designed to be folded up and stored on a submarine within an 8-foot space. It was a single-seat, mid-wing monoplane powered by a  Warner Scarab radial engine mounted above the wing driving a pusher propeller. Originally designated the XSL-1 by the Navy it was re-designated XSL-2 in 1932 when it was re-engined with a  Menasco B-6 engine. Only the prototype was built and it was not ordered into production.

Variants
XSL-1
Prototype with a Warner Scarab engine.
XSL-2
Prototype re-engined with a Menasco B-6 engine.

Specifications (XSL-1)

See also

Notes

Bibliography
 

SL
1930s United States military reconnaissance aircraft
Submarine-borne aircraft
Flying boats
High-wing aircraft
Single-engined pusher aircraft
Aircraft first flown in 1931